Erb1 also known as the eukaryotic ribosome biogenesis protein 1  is a yeast protein required for maturation of the 25S and 5.8S ribosomal RNAs. It is a component of 66S pre-ribosomal particles and is homologous to the human protein BOP1.

References

External links
 
 

Proteins